Joson is a surname. Notable people with the surname include:

Eduardo Joson (1919–1990), Filipino captain
Eduardo Nonato Joson (born 1950), Filipino politician
Elisse Joson (born 1996), Filipino actress, model, and endorser
Tomas Joson III (1948–2020), Filipino politician

See also
Joseon (disambiguation)